Peščenica may refer to:
Peščenica or Stara Peščenica, a neighborhood of Zagreb, Croatia
Peščenica – Žitnjak, a city district of Zagreb
Republic of Peščenica, a fictional state located in Zagreb

See also
Pešćenica, Sisak-Moslavina County, a village in Croatia